Maldives competed in the 2019 South Asian Games in Kathmandu and Pokhara, Nepal from 1 to 10 December 2019.

Medal tally

References

Nations at the 2019 South Asian Games